Bhana  is a village in Kapurthala district of Punjab State, India. The village is administrated by a Sarpanch, who is an elected representative.

Demography 
According to the report published by Census India in 2011, Bhana has a total number of 12 houses and population of 58 of which include 29 males and 29 females. Literacy rate of Bhana is  74.51%, lower than state average of 75.84%.  The population of children under the age of 6 years is 7 which is  12.07% of total population of Bhana, and child sex ratio is approximately  1333, higher than state average of 846.

Population data

Air travel connectivity 
The closest airport to the village is Sri Guru Ram Dass Jee International Airport.

Villages in Kapurthala

External links
  Villages in Kapurthala
 Kapurthala Villages List

References

Villages in Kapurthala district